Sar Gar (also Romanized as Sar-e Gar; also known as Sangar and Sar Gar Borāzjān) is a village in Ahmadabad Rural District, in the Central District of Firuzabad County, Fars Province, Iran. At the 2006 census, its population was 931, in 208 families.

References 

Populated places in Firuzabad County